LOS AS is a Norwegian electricity supplier and is a wholly owned subsidiary of Agder Energi. The company is the Norway's third largest household supplier. The company's core business is the supply of electricity products tailored to the differing needs of the household. LOS does not generate electricity, but enters into purchase and price-hedging agreements in order to supply electricity to its customers.

In 2010, the Norwegian research programme Norwegian Customer Barometer named LOS as the electricity supplier with the most satisfied customers. The company is certified by the Eco-Lighthouse Foundation and supplies renewable energy certified with guarantees of origin to both the household and business markets.

About the company
The company has 110 employees and posted revenues of NOK 3.1 billion for 2016. The company is headquartered in Kristiansand with regional offices in Arendal and at Lysaker (just outside Oslo). The company also has offices at Flekkefjord and Evje.

Cooperation partners
LOS has entered into cooperation agreements with organisations including OBOS (the leading Norwegian cooperative building association), the Norwegian Nurses' Organisation and the Federation of Norwegian Industries.
These organisations recommend LOS as an electricity supplier to their members.

Electric power companies of Norway